Hendley Stone Bennett (April 7, 1807 – December 15, 1891) was a slave owner and U.S. Representative from Mississippi.

Biography
Born near Franklin, Tennessee, Bennett attended the public schools in West Point, Mississippi.
He studied law.
He was admitted to the bar in 1830 and commenced practice in Columbus, Mississippi.
He served as judge of the circuit court 1846–1854.

Bennett was elected as a Democrat to the Thirty-fourth Congress (March 4, 1855 – March 4, 1857).
He was an unsuccessful candidate for renomination in 1856.
He resumed the practice of law in Columbus.
He moved to Paris, Texas, in 1859 and continued the practice of law.
He served as a captain in Company G of the 32nd Texas Cavalry Regiment in the Confederate States Army, from August 5, 1861, to August 31, 1862.
He resumed the practice of law.
In 1886, he returned to Franklin, Tennessee, and continued the practicing law.
He died in Franklin on December 15, 1891.
He was interred in Mount Hope Cemetery.

References

1807 births
1891 deaths
Confederate States Army officers
Mississippi state court judges
Democratic Party members of the United States House of Representatives from Mississippi
19th-century American politicians
People from Franklin, Tennessee
People from Columbus, Mississippi
People from Paris, Texas
19th-century American judges
Military personnel from Texas